Carlo Paech (born 18 December 1992) is a German athlete who specialises in the pole vault. He competed at the 2015 World Championships in Beijing narrowly missing the final. His personal bests are 5.80 metres outdoors (Zweibrücken 2015) and 5.67 metres indoors (Zürich 2015).

Competition record

Notes

References

External links
 
 

1992 births
Living people
German male pole vaulters
World Athletics Championships athletes for Germany
Athletes from Berlin